Savage Splendor is a 1949 documentary directed by Armand Denis and Lewis Cotlow, and starring Tim Holt.

It made a profit of $250,000 and was RKO's most popular film of the year.

References

External links
Savage Splendor at IMDb

1949 documentary films
1949 films
American documentary films
1940s American films
1940s English-language films